XHEZAR-FM is a radio station on 96.1 FM in Puebla, Puebla, Mexico. It carries the Arroba FM pop format from Grupo Radiorama.

History
XEZAR-AM 920 received its concession on January 6, 1989. It began broadcasting later that year as part of Corporación Puebla de Radiodifusión, a subsidiary company of Grupo ACIR; the concession was held by Alberto Guilbot Serros until ACIR purchased it outright in 1998. Three years later, it became , a repeater of the Mexico City stations 88.9 Noticias and La 1260.

In 2009, Grupo ACIR sold a group of its stations, located throughout Mexico, to Radiorama, including XEZAR-AM. This was Radiorama's first station in the Puebla market, and the company opted to lease it out to Grupo Oro. It changed to grupera music as  before becoming W Radio Puebla in 2012. 

In 2014, control of XEZAR-AM was taken over by Radiorama. In 2017, it joined the Arroba FM pop network.

XEZAR migrated to FM on September 13, 2018, as XHEZAR-FM 96.1. A new tower was installed at the Radiorama studios. The AM station concluded broadcasting in 2020.

References

Mass media in Puebla (city)
1989 establishments in Mexico
Radio stations established in 1989